Anna Richardson is a Sint Maarten politician.  she serves as Minister of Justice in the second cabinet of Prime Minister Silveria Jacobs.

References 

Living people
Year of birth missing (living people)
Place of birth missing (living people)
Sint Maarten women in politics
21st-century women politicians